Memory Chapel is a Los Angeles Historic-Cultural Monument (HCM #155) located in the Wilmington section of Los Angeles, California, near the Port of Los Angeles.  Built in 1870 in the Carpenter Gothic Victorian architecture style, it is the oldest Protestant church in the Harbor area.  Originally located at "F" Street and Marine Avenue, it was moved to its present location in 1939. In 1946, the chapel was designated as a historical landmark under auspices of the Wilmington Parlor No. 278, Native Daughters of the Golden West.

The chapel is used now by a Philippine church, with Sunday services in the Tagalog language. The original pews dating to 1870 are still in use at the chapel. English services are held in the adjacent Calvary Presbyterian Church—which replaced the Memory Chapel.

See also
 List of Los Angeles Historic-Cultural Monuments in the Harbor area

References

Churches in Los Angeles
Chapels in Los Angeles
Wilmington, Los Angeles
Churches completed in 1870
19th-century churches in the United States
Los Angeles Historic-Cultural Monuments
Carpenter Gothic church buildings in California